Orville James Moody (December 9, 1933 – August 8, 2008) was an American professional golfer who won numerous tournaments in his career. He won the U.S. Open in 1969, the last champion in the 20th century to win through local and sectional qualifying.

Early life
Born in Chickasha, Oklahoma, Moody was the youngest of ten children. The son of a golf course superintendent, he began his career at Capitol Hill High School in Oklahoma City, winning the 1952 state high school golf championship. After attempting college for a few weeks at the University of Oklahoma in Norman, Moody joined the U.S. Army. He was able to continue playing golf while in uniform, winning the All-Service championship and three Korea Opens. He spent fourteen years in the Army, heading up maintenance supervision and instruction at all Army golf courses.

Professional golf career
Moody gave up his military career in favor of a trial run at the PGA Tour in 1967. His nickname on tour was "Sarge" because he rose to the rank of sergeant in the Army. Moody had limited success on the PGA Tour prior to 1969. In April of that year, he took part in a four-way playoff at the Greater Greensboro Open won by Gene Littler.

The U.S. Open in 1969 was played in June at the Cypress Creek Course of the Champions Golf Club in Houston, Texas. Defending champion Lee Trevino picked Moody to win, saying, "He's one helluva player." Moody won by one stroke over Deane Beman, Al Geiberger, and Bob Rosburg with a 72-hole score of 281. He tied for sixteenth at the British Open, tied for seventh at the PGA Championship, and was named PGA Player of the Year for 1969.

The U.S. Open win was Moody's sole tour victory in 266 career events, although he was runner-up five times. He toured Japan, played in a few tournaments and eventually took a club pro job in Sulphur Springs, Texas. Moody was troubled by poor putting during his early pro years.

His career on the Senior PGA Tour (now PGA Tour Champions) was dramatically different. After turning fifty in late 1983, he won two of his first five tournaments in 1984 and finished fifth on the money list.  In 1989, he became only the fourth man to win both the U.S. Open and the U.S. Senior Open. Moody went to a long putter after becoming a senior golfer, and this method improved his putting significantly. He had eleven wins on the senior tour, with the last in 1992.

Moody had triple bypass heart surgery prior to the 1995 season, but still managed to play in 29 events.

Later life
Moody continued to play in charity and other golf events up until 2007. The following year, he died at age 74 in Allen, Texas, from complications of a stroke he had earlier suffered and/or complications from multiple myeloma. He was survived by his wife, Beverly, their son and three daughters, and eight grandchildren.

Professional wins (31)

PGA Tour wins (1)

PGA Tour playoff record (0–2)

Asia Golf Circuit wins (1)

Korean wins (5)
1958 Korea Open
1959 KPGA Championship, Korea Open
1960 Korea Open
1966 KPGA Championship

Other wins (3)
This list is incomplete
1969 World Series of Golf, World Cup (team with Lee Trevino)
1971 Hassan II Golf Trophy

Senior PGA Tour wins (11)

*Note: Tournament shortened to 36 holes due to weather.

Senior PGA Tour playoff record (3–4)

Other senior wins (10)
1984 Viceroy Panama Open
1986 Australian PGA Seniors Championship
1987 Liberty Mutual Legends of Golf (with Bruce Crampton)
1987 Australian PGA Seniors Championship
1988 Liberty Mutual Legends of Golf (with Bruce Crampton)
1995 Liberty Mutual Legends of Golf - Legendary Division (with Jimmy Powell)
1996 Liberty Mutual Legends of Golf - Legendary Division (with Jimmy Powell)
1999 Liberty Mutual Legends of Golf - Legendary Division (with Jimmy Powell)
2005 Liberty Mutual Legends of Golf - Demaret Division (with Jimmy Powell)
2006 Liberty Mutual Legends of Golf - Demaret Division (with Jimmy Powell)

Major championships

Wins (1)

Results timeline

CUT = missed the half-way cut (3rd round cut in 1970 and 1980 Open Championships)
WD = withdrew
"T" = tied

Summary

Most consecutive cuts made – 4 (1969 U.S. Open – 1970 Masters)
Longest streak of top-10s – 1 (twice)

Champions Tour major championships

Wins (2)

U.S. national team appearances
Professional
World Cup: 1969 (winners)

See also
1967 PGA Tour Qualifying School graduates
List of golfers with most Champions Tour wins

References

External links

American male golfers
PGA Tour golfers
PGA Tour Champions golfers
Winners of men's major golf championships
Winners of senior major golf championships
Golfers from Oklahoma
Golfers from Texas
United States Army soldiers
Deaths from multiple myeloma
People from Chickasha, Oklahoma
1933 births
2008 deaths